David Brierly (January 1935 – 10 June 2008), also known as David Brierley,  was an English actor.

Born in Yorkshire, he appeared in various television programmes but is most notable for being the voice of the robot dog K-9 during the 1979–1980 season of the BBC science fiction television series Doctor Who. He succeeded John Leeson, who was K-9's original voice (Leeson subsequently returned to the role the next season). He also appeared as one of Ken Barlow's university lodgers Milo, in a very early episode of Coronation Street, later returning to play "Harold" a carpet layer who put in some carpets for Hilda Ogden, and Jimmy Kemp's father in the acclaimed nuclear war drama Threads.  Brierly died of cancer on 10 June 2008.

Filmography

Film

Television

References

External links

1935 births
2008 deaths
Deaths from cancer in England
English male television actors
English male voice actors
Male actors from Yorkshire
20th-century English male actors